Nazism, the common name in English for National Socialism, is the political ideology and practices associated with Adolf Hitler and the Nazi Party (NSDAP) in Nazi Germany. During Hitler's rise to power in the 1930s in Europe, it was frequently referred to as Hitlerism. It is placed on the far-right of the political spectrum, and is extensively referred to as an example of totalitarianism. The later related term "neo-Nazism" is applied to other far-right groups with similar ideas which formed after the Second World War.

Nazism is a form of fascism, with disdain for liberal democracy and the parliamentary system. It incorporates a dictatorship, fervent antisemitism, anti-communism, scientific racism, white supremacy, social Darwinism and the use of eugenics into its creed. Its extreme nationalism originated in pan-Germanism and the ethno-nationalist neopagan Völkisch movement which had been a prominent aspect of German ultranationalism since the late 19th century, and it was strongly influenced by the  paramilitary groups that emerged after Germany's defeat in World War I, from which came the party's underlying "cult of violence". Nazism subscribed to pseudo-scientific theories of a racial hierarchy, identifying Germans as part of what the Nazis regarded as an Aryan or Nordic master race. It aimed to overcome social divisions and create a homogeneous German society based on racial purity which represented a people's community.

The term "National Socialism" arose out of attempts to create a nationalist redefinition of socialism, as an alternative to both Marxist international socialism and free-market capitalism. Nazism rejected the Marxist concepts of class conflict and universal equality, opposed cosmopolitan internationalism, and sought to convince all parts of the new German society to subordinate their personal interests to the "common good", accepting political interests as the main priority of economic organisation, which tended to match the general outlook of collectivism or communitarianism rather than economic socialism. The Nazi Party's precursor, the pan-German nationalist and antisemitic German Workers' Party (DAP), was founded on 5 January 1919. By the early 1920s, the party was renamed the National Socialist German Workers' Party in order to appeal to left-wing workers, a renaming that Hitler initially objected to. The National Socialist Program, or "25 Points", was adopted in 1920 and called for a united Greater Germany that would deny citizenship to Jews or those of Jewish descent, while also supporting land reform and the nationalisation of some industries. In  ("My Struggle"), published in 1925–1926, Hitler outlined the antisemitism and anti-communism at the heart of his political philosophy as well as his disdain for representative democracy and his belief in Germany's right to territorial expansion.

The Nazi Party won the greatest share of the popular vote in the two  general elections of 1932, making them the largest party in the legislature by far, albeit still short of an outright majority (37.3% on 31 July 1932 and 33.1% on 6 November 1932). Because none of the parties were willing or able to put together a coalition government, Hitler was appointed Chancellor of Germany on 30 January 1933 by President Paul von Hindenburg through the support and connivance of traditional conservative nationalists who believed that they could control him and his party. With the use of emergency presidential decrees by Hindenburg and a change in the Weimar Constitution which allowed the Cabinet to rule by direct decree, bypassing both Hindenburg and the Reichstag, the Nazis soon established a one-party state and began the Gleichschaltung.

Using the SS for the task, Hitler purged the party's more socially and economically radical factions in the mid-1934 Night of the Long Knives, including the leadership of the SA. From that point, Hitler was effectively the dictator of Nazi Germany – also known as the Third Reich – under which Jews, political opponents and other "undesirable" elements were marginalised, imprisoned or murdered. During World War II, many millions of people—including around two-thirds of the Jewish population of Europe—were eventually exterminated in a genocide which became known as the Holocaust. Following Germany's defeat in World War II and the discovery of the full extent of the Holocaust, Nazi ideology became universally disgraced. It is widely regarded as immoral and evil, with only a few fringe racist groups, usually referred to as neo-Nazis, describing themselves as followers of National Socialism.

Etymology 

The full name of the party was Nationalsozialistische Deutsche Arbeiterpartei and they officially used the acronym NSDAP. The term "Nazi" was in use before the rise of the NSDAP as a colloquial and derogatory word for a backwards farmer or peasant, characterising an awkward and clumsy person, a yokel. In this sense, the word Nazi was a hypocorism of the German male name Igna(t)z (itself a variation of the name Ignatius)—Igna(t)z being a common name at the time in Bavaria, the area from which the NSDAP emerged.

In the 1920s, political opponents of the NSDAP in the German labour movement seized on this. Using the earlier abbreviated term "Sozi" for Sozialist as an example, they shortened the NSDAP's name, Nationalsozialistische, to the dismissive "Nazi", in order to associate them with the derogatory use of the term mentioned above. The first use of the term "Nazi" by the National Socialists occurred in 1926 in a publication by Joseph Goebbels called Der Nazi-Sozi ["The Nazi-Sozi"]. In Goebbels' pamphlet, the word "Nazi" only appears when linked with the word "Sozi" as an abbreviation of "National Socialism".

After the NSDAP's rise to power in the 1930s, the use of the term "Nazi" by itself or in terms such as "Nazi Germany", "Nazi regime" and so on was popularised by German exiles outside the country, but not in Germany. From them, the term spread into other languages and it was eventually brought back into Germany after World War II. The NSDAP briefly adopted the designation "Nazi" in an attempt to reappropriate the term, but it soon gave up this effort and generally avoided using the term while it was in power. In each case, the authors typically referred to themselves as "National Socialists" and their movement as "National Socialism", but never as "Nazis." A compendium of Hitler's conversations from 1941 through 1944 entitled Hitler's Table Talk does not contain the word "Nazi" either. In speeches by Hermann Göring, he never uses the term "Nazi." Hitler Youth leader Melita Maschmann wrote a book about her experience entitled Account Rendered. She did not refer to herself as a "Nazi", even though she was writing well after World War II. In 1933, 581 members of the National Socialist Party answered interview questions put to them by Professor Theodore Abel from Columbia University. They similarly did not refer to themselves as "Nazis."

Position within the political spectrum 

The majority of scholars identify Nazism in both theory and practice as a form of far-right politics. Far-right themes in Nazism include the argument that superior people have a right to dominate other people and purge society of supposed inferior elements. Adolf Hitler and other proponents denied that Nazism was either left-wing or right-wing: instead, they officially portrayed Nazism as a syncretic movement. In Mein Kampf, Hitler directly attacked both left-wing and right-wing politics in Germany, saying:

Today our left-wing politicians in particular are constantly insisting that their craven-hearted and obsequious foreign policy necessarily results from the disarmament of Germany, whereas the truth is that this is the policy of traitors ... But the politicians of the Right deserve exactly the same reproach. It was through their miserable cowardice that those ruffians of Jews who came into power in 1918 were able to rob the nation of its arms.

In a speech given in Munich on 12 April 1922, Hitler stated:

There are only two possibilities in Germany; do not imagine that the people will forever go with the middle party, the party of compromises; one day it will turn to those who have most consistently foretold the coming ruin and have sought to dissociate themselves from it. And that party is either the Left: and then God help us! for it will lead us to complete destruction—to Bolshevism, or else it is a party of the Right which at the last, when the people is in utter despair, when it has lost all its spirit and has no longer any faith in anything, is determined for its part ruthlessly to seize the reins of power—that is the beginning of resistance of which I spoke a few minutes ago.

Hitler at times redefined socialism. When George Sylvester Viereck interviewed Hitler in October 1923 and asked him why he referred to his party as 'socialists' he replied:

In 1929 Hitler gave a speech to a group of Nazi leaders and simplified 'socialism' to mean, "Socialism! That is an unfortunate word altogether... What does socialism really mean? If people have something to eat and their pleasures, then they have their socialism."

When asked in an interview on 27 January 1934 whether he supported the "bourgeois right-wing", Hitler claimed that Nazism was not exclusively for any class and he indicated that it favoured neither the left nor the right, but preserved "pure" elements from both "camps" by stating: "From the camp of bourgeois tradition, it takes national resolve, and from the materialism of the Marxist dogma, living, creative Socialism".

Historians regard the equation of Nazism as "Hitlerism" as too simplistic since the term was used prior to the rise of Hitler and the Nazis. In addition, the different ideologies incorporated into Nazism were already well established in certain parts of German society long before World War I. The Nazis were strongly influenced by the post–World War I far-right in Germany, which held common beliefs such as anti-Marxism, anti-liberalism and antisemitism, along with nationalism, contempt for the Treaty of Versailles and condemnation of the Weimar Republic for signing the armistice in November 1918 which later led it to sign the Treaty of Versailles. A major inspiration for the Nazis were the far-right nationalist Freikorps, paramilitary organisations that engaged in political violence after World War I. Initially, the post–World War I German far-right was dominated by monarchists, but the younger generation, which was associated with völkisch nationalism, was more radical and it did not express any emphasis on the restoration of the German monarchy. This younger generation desired to dismantle the Weimar Republic and create a new radical and strong state based upon a martial ruling ethic that could revive the "Spirit of 1914" which was associated with German national unity (Volksgemeinschaft).

The Nazis, the far-right monarchists, the reactionary German National People's Party (DNVP) and others, such as monarchist officers in the German Army and several prominent industrialists, formed an alliance in opposition to the Weimar Republic on 11 October 1931 in Bad Harzburg, officially known as the "National Front", but commonly referred to as the Harzburg Front. The Nazis stated that the alliance was purely tactical and they continued to have differences with the DNVP. After the elections of July 1932, the alliance broke down when the DNVP lost many of its seats in the Reichstag. The Nazis denounced them as "an insignificant heap of reactionaries". The DNVP responded by denouncing the Nazis for their socialism, their street violence and the "economic experiments" that would take place if the Nazis ever rose to power. But amidst an inconclusive political situation in which conservative politicians Franz von Papen and Kurt von Schleicher were unable to form stable governments without the Nazis, Papen proposed to President Hindenburg to appoint Hitler as Chancellor at the head of a government formed primarily of conservatives, with only three Nazi ministers. Hindenburg did so, and contrary to the expectations of Papen and the DNVP, Hitler was soon able to establish a Nazi one-party dictatorship.

Kaiser Wilhelm II, who was pressured to abdicate the throne and flee into exile amidst an attempted communist revolution in Germany, initially supported the Nazi Party. His four sons, including Prince Eitel Friedrich and Prince Oskar, became members of the Nazi Party in hopes that in exchange for their support, the Nazis would permit the restoration of the monarchy.

There were factions within the Nazi Party, both conservative and radical. The conservative Nazi Hermann Göring urged Hitler to conciliate with capitalists and reactionaries. Other prominent conservative Nazis included Heinrich Himmler and Reinhard Heydrich. Meanwhile, the radical Nazi Joseph Goebbels opposed capitalism, viewing it as having Jews at its core and he stressed the need for the party to emphasise both a proletarian and a national character. Those views were shared by Otto Strasser, who later left the Nazi Party and formed the Black Front in the belief that Hitler had allegedly betrayed the party's socialist goals by endorsing capitalism.

When the Nazi Party emerged from obscurity to become a major political force after 1929, the conservative faction rapidly gained more influence, as wealthy donors took an interest in the Nazis as a potential bulwark against communism. The Nazi Party had previously been financed almost entirely from membership dues, but after 1929 its leadership began actively seeking donations from German industrialists, and Hitler began holding dozens of fundraising meetings with business leaders. In the midst of the Great Depression, facing the possibility of economic ruin on the one hand and a Communist or Social Democrat government on the other hand, German business increasingly turned to Nazism as offering a way out of the situation, by promising a state-driven economy that would support, rather than attack, existing business interests. By January 1933, the Nazi Party had secured the support of important sectors of German industry, mainly among the steel and coal producers, the insurance business, and the chemical industry.

Large segments of the Nazi Party, particularly among the members of the Sturmabteilung (SA), were committed to the party's official socialist, revolutionary and anti-capitalist positions and expected both a social and an economic revolution when the party gained power in 1933. In the period immediately before the Nazi seizure of power, there were even Social Democrats and Communists who switched sides and became known as "Beefsteak Nazis": brown on the outside and red inside. The leader of the SA, Ernst Röhm, pushed for a "second revolution" (the "first revolution" being the Nazis' seizure of power) that would enact socialist policies. Furthermore, Röhm desired that the SA absorb the much smaller German Army into its ranks under his leadership. Once the Nazis achieved power, Röhm's SA was directed by Hitler to violently suppress the parties of the left, but they also began attacks against individuals deemed to be associated with conservative reaction. Hitler saw Röhm's independent actions as violating and possibly threatening his leadership, as well as jeopardising the regime by alienating the conservative President Paul von Hindenburg and the conservative-oriented German Army. This resulted in Hitler purging Röhm and other radical members of the SA in 1934, in what came to be known as the Night of the Long Knives.

Before he joined the Bavarian Army to fight in World War I, Hitler had lived a bohemian lifestyle as a petty street watercolour artist in Vienna and Munich and he maintained elements of this lifestyle later on, going to bed very late and rising in the afternoon, even after he became Chancellor and then Führer. After the war, his battalion was absorbed by the Bavarian Soviet Republic from 1918 to 1919, where he was elected Deputy Battalion Representative. According to historian Thomas Weber, Hitler attended the funeral of communist Kurt Eisner (a German Jew), wearing a black mourning armband on one arm and a red communist armband on the other, which he took as evidence that Hitler's political beliefs had not yet solidified. In Mein Kampf, Hitler never mentioned any service with the Bavarian Soviet Republic and he stated that he became an antisemite in 1913 during his years in Vienna. This statement has been disputed by the contention that he was not an antisemite at that time, even though it is well established that he read many antisemitic tracts and journals during that time and admired Karl Lueger, the antisemitic mayor of Vienna. Hitler altered his political views in response to the signing of the Treaty of Versailles in June 1919 and it was then that he became an antisemitic, German nationalist.

Hitler expressed opposition to capitalism, regarding it as having Jewish origins and accusing capitalism of holding nations ransom to the interests of a parasitic cosmopolitan rentier class. He also expressed opposition to communism and egalitarian forms of socialism, arguing that inequality and hierarchy are beneficial to the nation. He believed that communism was invented by the Jews to weaken nations by promoting class struggle. After his rise to power, Hitler took a pragmatic position on economics, accepting private property and allowing capitalist private enterprises to exist so long as they adhered to the goals of the Nazi state, but not tolerating enterprises that he saw as being opposed to the national interest.

German business leaders disliked Nazi ideology but came to support Hitler, because they saw the Nazis as a useful ally to promote their interests. Business groups made significant financial contributions to the Nazi Party both before and after the Nazi seizure of power, in the hope that a Nazi dictatorship would eliminate the organised labour movement and the left-wing parties. Hitler actively sought to gain the support of business leaders by arguing that private enterprise is incompatible with democracy.

Although he opposed communist ideology, Hitler publicly praised the Soviet Union's leader Joseph Stalin and Stalinism on numerous occasions. Hitler commended Stalin for seeking to purify the Communist Party of the Soviet Union of Jewish influences, noting Stalin's purging of Jewish communists such as Leon Trotsky, Grigory Zinoviev, Lev Kamenev and Karl Radek. While Hitler had always intended to bring Germany into conflict with the Soviet Union so he could gain Lebensraum ("living space"), he supported a temporary strategic alliance between Nazi Germany and the Soviet Union to form a common anti-liberal front so they could defeat liberal democracies, particularly France.

Hitler admired the British Empire and its colonial system as living proof of Germanic superiority over "inferior" races and saw the United Kingdom as Germany's natural ally. He wrote in Mein Kampf: "For a long time to come there will be only two Powers in Europe with which it may be possible for Germany to conclude an alliance. These Powers are Great Britain and Italy."

Origins 

The historical roots of Nazism are to be found in various elements of European political culture which were in circulation in the intellectual capitals of the continent, what Joachim Fest called the "scrapheap of ideas" prevalent at the time. In Hitler and the Collapse of the Weimar Republic, historian Martin Broszat points out that

[A]lmost all essential elements of ... Nazi ideology were to be found in the radical positions of ideological protest movements [in pre-1914 Germany].  These were: a virulent anti-Semitism, a blood-and-soil ideology, the notion of a master race, [and] the idea of territorial acquisition and settlement in the East.  These ideas were embedded in a popular nationalism which was vigorously anti-modernist, anti-humanist and pseudo-religious.

Brought together, the result was an anti-intellectual and politically semi-illiterate ideology lacking cohesion, a product of mass culture which allowed its followers  emotional attachment and offered a simplified and easily-digestible world-view based on a political mythology for the masses.

Völkisch nationalism 

Adolf Hitler himself along with other members of the National Socialist German Workers' Party (German: Nationalsozialistische Deutsche Arbeiterpartei, NSDAP) in the Weimar Republic (1918–1933) were greatly influenced by several 19th- and early 20th-century thinkers and proponents of philosophical, onto-epistemic, and theoretical perspectives on ecological anthropology, scientific racism, holistic science, and organicism regarding the constitution of complex systems and theorization of organic-racial societies. In particular, one of the most significant ideological influences on the Nazis was the 19th-century German nationalist philosopher Johann Gottlieb Fichte, whose works had served as an inspiration to Hitler and other Nazi Party members, and whose ideas were implemented among the philosophical and ideological foundations of Nazi-oriented Völkisch nationalism.

Johann Gottlieb Fichte's works served as an inspiration to Hitler and other Nazi Party members, including Dietrich Eckart and Arnold Fanck. In Speeches to the German Nation (1808), written amid the First French Empire's occupation of Berlin during the Napoleonic Wars, Fichte called for a German national revolution against the French Imperial Army occupiers, making passionate public speeches, arming his students for battle against the French and stressing the need for action by the German nation so it could free itself. Fichte's German nationalism was populist and opposed to traditional elites, spoke of the need for a "People's War" (Volkskrieg) and put forth concepts similar to those which the Nazis adopted. Fichte promoted German exceptionalism and stressed the need for the German nation to purify itself (including purging the German language of French words, a policy that the Nazis undertook upon their rise to power).

Another important figure in pre-Nazi völkisch thinking was Wilhelm Heinrich Riehl, whose work—Land und Leute (Land and People, written between 1857 and 1863)—collectively tied the organic German Volk to its native landscape and nature, a pairing which stood in stark opposition to the mechanical and materialistic civilisation which was then developing as a result of industrialisation. Geographers Friedrich Ratzel and Karl Haushofer borrowed from Riehl's work as did Nazi ideologues Alfred Rosenberg and Paul Schultze-Naumburg, both of whom employed some of Riehl's philosophy in arguing that "each nation-state was an organism that required a particular living space in order to survive". Riehl's influence is overtly discernible in the Blut und Boden (Blood and Soil) philosophy introduced by Oswald Spengler, which the Nazi agriculturalist Walther Darré and other prominent Nazis adopted.

Völkisch nationalism denounced soulless materialism, individualism and secularised urban industrial society, while advocating a "superior" society based on ethnic German "folk" culture and German "blood". It denounced foreigners and foreign ideas and declared that Jews, Freemasons and others were "traitors to the nation" and unworthy of inclusion. Völkisch nationalism saw the world in terms of natural law and romanticism and it viewed societies as organic, extolling the virtues of rural life, condemning the neglect of tradition and the decay of morals, denounced the destruction of the natural environment and condemned "cosmopolitan" cultures such as Jews and Romani.

The first party that attempted to combine nationalism and socialism was the (Austria-Hungary) German Workers' Party, which predominantly aimed to solve the conflict between the Austrian Germans and the Czechs in the multi-ethnic Austrian Empire, then part of Austria-Hungary. In 1896 the German politician Friedrich Naumann formed the National-Social Association which aimed to combine German nationalism and a non-Marxist form of socialism together; the attempt turned out to be futile and the idea of linking nationalism with socialism quickly became equated with antisemites, extreme German nationalists and the völkisch movement in general.

During the era of the German Empire, völkisch nationalism was overshadowed by both Prussian patriotism and the federalist tradition of its various component states. The events of World War I, including the end of the Prussian monarchy in Germany, resulted in a surge of revolutionary völkisch nationalism. The Nazis supported such revolutionary völkisch nationalist policies and they claimed that their ideology was influenced by the leadership and policies of German Chancellor Otto von Bismarck, who was instrumental in founding the German Empire. The Nazis declared that they were dedicated to continuing the process of creating a unified German nation state that Bismarck had begun and desired to achieve. While Hitler was supportive of Bismarck's creation of the German Empire, he was critical of Bismarck's moderate domestic policies. On the issue of Bismarck's support of a Kleindeutschland ("Lesser Germany", excluding Austria) versus the Pan-German Großdeutschland ("Greater Germany") which the Nazis advocated, Hitler stated that Bismarck's attainment of Kleindeutschland was the "highest achievement" Bismarck could have achieved "within the limits possible at that time". In Mein Kampf (My Struggle), Hitler presented himself as a "second Bismarck".

During his youth in Austria, Hitler was politically influenced by Austrian Pan-Germanist proponent Georg Ritter von Schönerer, who advocated radical German nationalism, antisemitism, anti-Catholicism, anti-Slavic sentiment and anti-Habsburg views. From von Schönerer and his followers, Hitler adopted for the Nazi movement the Heil greeting, the Führer title and the model of absolute party leadership. Hitler was also impressed by the populist antisemitism and the anti-liberal bourgeois agitation of Karl Lueger, who as the mayor of Vienna during Hitler's time in the city used a rabble-rousing style of oratory that appealed to the wider masses. Unlike von Schönerer, Lueger was not a German nationalist and instead was a pro-Catholic Habsburg supporter and only used German nationalist notions occasionally for his own agenda. Although Hitler praised both Lueger and Schönerer, he criticised the former for not applying a racial doctrine against the Jews and Slavs.

Racial theories and antisemitism 

The concept of the Aryan race, which the Nazis promoted, stems from racial theories asserting that Europeans are the descendants of Indo-Iranian settlers, people of ancient India and ancient Persia. Proponents of this theory based their assertion on the fact that words in European languages and words in Indo-Iranian languages have similar pronunciations and meanings. Johann Gottfried Herder argued that the Germanic peoples held close racial connections to the ancient Indians and the ancient Persians, who he claimed were advanced peoples that possessed a great capacity for wisdom, nobility, restraint and science. Contemporaries of Herder used the concept of the Aryan race to draw a distinction between what they deemed to be "high and noble" Aryan culture versus that of "parasitic" Semitic culture.

Notions of white supremacy and Aryan racial superiority were combined in the 19th century, with white supremacists maintaining the belief that certain groups of white people were members of an Aryan "master race" that is superior to other races and particularly superior to the Semitic race, which they associated with "cultural sterility". Arthur de Gobineau, a French racial theorist and aristocrat, blamed the fall of the ancien régime in France on racial degeneracy caused by racial intermixing, which he argued had destroyed the purity of the Aryan race, a term which he only reserved for Germanic people. Gobineau's theories, which attracted a strong following in Germany, emphasised the existence of an irreconcilable polarity between Aryan (Germanic) and Jewish cultures.

Aryan mysticism claimed that Christianity originated in Aryan religious traditions, and that Jews had usurped the legend from Aryans. Houston Stewart Chamberlain, an English-born German proponent of racial theory, supported notions of Germanic supremacy and antisemitism in Germany. Chamberlain's work, The Foundations of the Nineteenth Century (1899), praised Germanic peoples for their creativity and idealism while asserting that the Germanic spirit was threatened by a "Jewish" spirit of selfishness and materialism. Chamberlain used his thesis to promote monarchical conservatism while denouncing democracy, liberalism and socialism. The book became popular, especially in Germany. Chamberlain stressed a nation's need to maintain its racial purity in order to prevent its degeneration and argued that racial intermingling with Jews should never be permitted. In 1923, Chamberlain met Hitler, whom he admired as a leader of the rebirth of the free spirit. Madison Grant's work The Passing of the Great Race (1916) advocated Nordicism and proposed that a eugenics program should be implemented in order to preserve the purity of the Nordic race. After reading the book, Hitler called it "my Bible".

In Germany, the belief that Jews were economically exploiting Germans became prominent due to the ascendancy of many wealthy Jews into prominent positions upon the unification of Germany in 1871. From 1871 to the early 20th century, German Jews were overrepresented in Germany's upper and middle classes while they were underrepresented in Germany's lower classes, particularly in the fields of agricultural and industrial labour. German Jewish financiers and bankers played a key role in fostering Germany's economic growth from 1871 to 1913 and they benefited enormously from this boom. In 1908, amongst the twenty-nine wealthiest German families with aggregate fortunes of up to 55 million marks at the time, five were Jewish and the Rothschilds were the second wealthiest German family. The predominance of Jews in Germany's banking, commerce and industry sectors during this time period was very high, even though Jews were estimated to account for only 1% of the population of Germany. The overrepresentation of Jews in these areas fuelled resentment among non-Jewish Germans during periods of economic crisis. The 1873 stock market crash and the ensuing depression resulted in a spate of attacks on alleged Jewish economic dominance in Germany and antisemitism increased. During this time period, in the 1870s, German völkisch nationalism began to adopt antisemitic and racist themes and it was also adopted by a number of radical right political movements.

Radical antisemitism was promoted by prominent advocates of völkisch nationalism, including Eugen Diederichs, Paul de Lagarde and Julius Langbehn. De Lagarde called the Jews a "bacillus, the carriers of decay ... who pollute every national culture ... and destroy all faiths with their materialistic liberalism" and he called for the extermination of the Jews. Langbehn called for a war of annihilation against the Jews, and his genocidal policies were later published by the Nazis and given to soldiers on the front during World War II. One antisemitic ideologue of the period, Friedrich Lange, even used the term "National Socialism" to describe his own anti-capitalist take on the völkisch nationalist template.

Johann Gottlieb Fichte accused Jews in Germany of having been and inevitably of continuing to be a "state within a state" that threatened German national unity. Fichte promoted two options in order to address this, his first one being the creation of a Jewish state in Palestine so the Jews could be impelled to leave Europe. His second option was violence against Jews and he said that the goal of the violence would be "to cut off all their heads in one night, and set new ones on their shoulders, which should not contain a single Jewish idea".

The Protocols of the Elders of Zion (1912) is an antisemitic forgery created by the secret service of the Russian Empire, the Okhrana. Many antisemites believed it was real and thus it became widely popular after World War I. The Protocols claimed that there was a secret international Jewish conspiracy to take over the world. Hitler had been introduced to The Protocols by Alfred Rosenberg and from 1920 onwards he focused his attacks by claiming that Judaism and Marxism were directly connected, that Jews and Bolsheviks were one and the same and that Marxism was a Jewish ideology-this became known as "Jewish Bolshevism". Hitler believed that The Protocols were authentic.

Prior to the Nazi ascension to power, Hitler often blamed moral degradation on Rassenschande ("racial defilement"), a way to assure his followers of his continuing antisemitism, which had been toned down for popular consumption. Prior to the induction of the Nuremberg Race Laws in 1935 by the Nazis, many German nationalists such as Roland Freisler strongly supported laws to ban Rassenschande between Aryans and Jews as racial treason. Even before the laws were officially passed, the Nazis banned sexual relations and marriages between party members and Jews. Party members found guilty of Rassenschande were severely punished; some party members were even sentenced to death.

The Nazis claimed that Bismarck was unable to complete German national unification because Jews had infiltrated the German parliament and they claimed that their abolition of parliament had ended this obstacle to unification. Using the stab-in-the-back myth, the Nazis accused Jews—and other populations who it considered non-German—of possessing extra-national loyalties, thereby exacerbating German antisemitism about the Judenfrage (the Jewish Question), the far-right political canard which was popular when the ethnic völkisch movement and its politics of Romantic nationalism for establishing a Großdeutschland was strong.

Nazism's racial policy positions may have developed from the views of important biologists of the 19th century, including French biologist Jean-Baptiste Lamarck, through Ernst Haeckel's idealist version of Lamarckism and the father of genetics, German botanist Gregor Mendel. Haeckel's works were later condemned by the Nazis as inappropriate for "National-Socialist formation and education in the Third Reich". This may have been because of his "monist" atheistic, materialist philosophy, which the Nazis disliked, along with his friendliness to Jews, opposition to militarism and support altruism, with one Nazi official calling for them to be banned. Unlike Darwinian theory, Lamarckian theory officially ranked races in a hierarchy of evolution from apes while Darwinian theory did not grade races in a hierarchy of higher or lower evolution from apes, but simply stated that all humans as a whole had progressed in their evolution from apes. Many Lamarckians viewed "lower" races as having been exposed to debilitating conditions for too long for any significant "improvement" of their condition to take place in the near future. Haeckel used Lamarckian theory to describe the existence of interracial struggle and put races on a hierarchy of evolution, ranging from wholly human to subhuman.

Mendelian inheritance, or Mendelism, was supported by the Nazis, as well as by mainstream eugenicists of the time. The Mendelian theory of inheritance declared that genetic traits and attributes were passed from one generation to another. Eugenicists used Mendelian inheritance theory to demonstrate the transfer of biological illness and impairments from parents to children, including mental disability, whereas others also used Mendelian theory to demonstrate the inheritance of social traits, with racialists claiming a racial nature behind certain general traits such as inventiveness or criminal behaviour.

Use of the American racist model 
Hitler and other Nazi legal theorists were inspired by America's institutional racism and saw it as the model to follow. In particular, they saw it as a model for the expansion of territory and the elimination of indigenous inhabitants therefrom, for laws denying full citizenship for African Americans, which they wanted to implement also against Jews, and for racist immigration laws banning some races. In "Mein Kampf" Hitler extolled America as the only contemporary example of a country with racist ("völkisch") citizenship statutes in the 1920s, and Nazi lawyers made use of the American models in crafting laws for Nazi Germany. U.S. citizenship laws and anti-miscegenation laws directly inspired the two principal Nuremberg Laws—the Citizenship Law and the Blood Law.

Response to World War I and Italian Fascism 
During World War I, German sociologist Johann Plenge spoke of the rise of a "National Socialism" in Germany within what he termed the "ideas of 1914" that were a declaration of war against the "ideas of 1789" (the French Revolution). According to Plenge, the "ideas of 1789" which included the rights of man, democracy, individualism and liberalism were being rejected in favour of "the ideas of 1914" which included the "German values" of duty, discipline, law and order. Plenge believed that ethnic solidarity (Volksgemeinschaft) would replace class division and that "racial comrades" would unite to create a socialist society in the struggle of "proletarian" Germany against "capitalist" Britain. He believed that the "Spirit of 1914" manifested itself in the concept of the "People's League of National Socialism". This National Socialism was a form of state socialism that rejected the "idea of boundless freedom" and promoted an economy that would serve the whole of Germany under the leadership of the state. This National Socialism was opposed to capitalism due to the components that were against "the national interest" of Germany, but insisted that National Socialism would strive for greater efficiency in the economy. Plenge advocated an authoritarian, rational ruling elite to develop National Socialism through a hierarchical technocratic state, and his ideas were part of the basis of Nazism.

Oswald Spengler, a German cultural philosopher, was a major influence on Nazism, although after 1933 he became alienated from Nazism and was later condemned by the Nazis for criticising Adolf Hitler. Spengler's conception of national socialism and a number of his political views were shared by the Nazis and the Conservative Revolutionary movement. Spengler's views were also popular amongst Italian Fascists, including Benito Mussolini.

Spengler's book The Decline of the West (1918), written during the final months of World War I, addressed the supposed decadence of modern European civilisation, which he claimed was caused by atomising and irreligious individualisation and cosmopolitanism. Spengler's major thesis was that a law of historical development of cultures existed involving a cycle of birth, maturity, ageing and death when it reaches its final form of civilisation. Upon reaching the point of civilisation, a culture will lose its creative capacity and succumb to decadence until the emergence of "barbarians" creates a new epoch. Spengler considered the Western world as having succumbed to decadence of intellect, money, cosmopolitan urban life, irreligious life, atomised individualisation and believed that it was at the end of its biological and "spiritual" fertility. He believed that the "young" German nation as an imperial power would inherit the legacy of Ancient Rome, lead a restoration of value in "blood" and instinct, while the ideals of rationalism would be revealed as absurd.

Spengler's notions of "Prussian socialism" as described in his book Preussentum und Sozialismus ("Prussiandom and Socialism", 1919), influenced Nazism and the Conservative Revolutionary movement. Spengler wrote: "The meaning of socialism is that life is controlled not by the opposition between rich and poor, but by the rank that achievement and talent bestow. That is our freedom, freedom from the economic despotism of the individual". Spengler adopted the anti-English ideas addressed by Plenge and Sombart during World War I that condemned English liberalism and English parliamentarianism while advocating a national socialism that was free from Marxism and that would connect the individual to the state through corporatist organisation. Spengler claimed that socialistic Prussian characteristics existed across Germany, including creativity, discipline, concern for the greater good, productivity and self-sacrifice. He prescribed war as a necessity by saying: "War is the eternal form of higher human existence and states exist for war: they are the expression of the will to war".

Spengler's definition of socialism did not advocate a change to property relations. He denounced Marxism for seeking to train the proletariat to "expropriate the expropriator", the capitalist and then to let them live a life of leisure on this expropriation. He claimed that "Marxism is the capitalism of the working class" and not true socialism. According to Spengler, true socialism would be in the form of corporatism, stating that "local corporate bodies organised according to the importance of each occupation to the people as a whole; higher representation in stages up to a supreme council of the state; mandates revocable at any time; no organised parties, no professional politicians, no periodic elections".

Wilhelm Stapel, an antisemitic German intellectual, used Spengler's thesis on the cultural confrontation between Jews as whom Spengler described as a Magian people versus Europeans as a Faustian people. Stapel described Jews as a landless nomadic people in pursuit of an international culture whereby they can integrate into Western civilisation. As such, Stapel claims that Jews have been attracted to "international" versions of socialism, pacifism or capitalism because as a landless people the Jews have transgressed various national cultural boundaries.

Arthur Moeller van den Bruck was initially the dominant figure of the Conservative Revolutionaries influenced Nazism. He rejected reactionary conservatism while proposing a new state that he coined the "Third Reich", which would unite all classes under authoritarian rule. Van den Bruck advocated a combination of the nationalism of the right and the socialism of the left.

Fascism was a major influence on Nazism. The seizure of power by Italian Fascist leader Benito Mussolini in the March on Rome in 1922 drew admiration by Hitler, who less than a month later had begun to model himself and the Nazi Party upon Mussolini and the Fascists. Hitler presented the Nazis as a form of German fascism. In November 1923, the Nazis attempted a "March on Berlin" modelled after the March on Rome, which resulted in the failed Beer Hall Putsch in Munich.

Hitler spoke of Nazism being indebted to the success of Fascism's rise to power in Italy. In a private conversation in 1941, Hitler said that "the brown shirt would probably not have existed without the black shirt", the "brown shirt" referring to the Nazi militia and the "black shirt" referring to the Fascist militia. He also said in regards to the 1920s: "If Mussolini had been outdistanced by Marxism, I don't know whether we could have succeeded in holding out. At that period National Socialism was a very fragile growth".

Other Nazis—especially those at the time associated with the party's more radical wing such as Gregor Strasser, Joseph Goebbels and Heinrich Himmler—rejected Italian Fascism, accusing it of being too conservative or capitalist. Alfred Rosenberg condemned Italian Fascism for being racially confused and having influences from philosemitism. Strasser criticised the policy of Führerprinzip as being created by Mussolini and considered its presence in Nazism as a foreign imported idea. Throughout the relationship between Nazi Germany and Fascist Italy, a number of lower-ranking Nazis scornfully viewed fascism as a conservative movement that lacked a full revolutionary potential.

Ideology and programme
In his book The Hitler State (Der Staat Hitlers), historian Martin Broszat writes:

...National Socialism was not primarily an ideological and programmatic, but a charismatic movement, whose ideology was incorporated in the Führer, Hitler, and which would have lost all its power to integrate without him. ... [T]he abstract, utopian and vague National Socialistic ideology only achieved what reality and certainty it had through the medium of Hitler.

Thus, any explication of the ideology of Nazism must be descriptive, as it was not generated primarily from first principles, but was the result of numerous factors, including Hitler's strongly-held personal views, some parts of the 25-point plan, the general goals of the völkische and nationalist movements, and the conflicts between Nazi Party functionaries who battled "to win [Hitler] over to their respective interpretations of [National Socialism]."  Once the Party had been purged of divergant influences such as Strasserism, Hitler was accepted by the Party's leadership as the "supreme authority to rule on ideological matters".

Nationalism and racialism 

Nazism emphasised German nationalism, including both irredentism and expansionism. Nazism held racial theories based upon a belief in the existence of an Aryan master race that was superior to all other races. The Nazis emphasised the existence of racial conflict between the Aryan race and others—particularly Jews, whom the Nazis viewed as a mixed race that had infiltrated multiple societies and was responsible for exploitation and repression of the Aryan race. The Nazis also categorised Slavs as Untermensch (sub-human).

Wolfgang Bialas argues that the Nazis' sense of morality could be described as a form of procedural virtue ethics, as it demanded unconditional obedience to absolute virtues with the attitude of social engineering and replaced common sense intuitions with an ideological catalogue of virtues and commands. The ideal Nazi new man was to be race-conscious and an ideologically dedicated warrior who would commit actions for the sake of the German race while at the same time convinced he was doing the right thing and acting morally. The Nazis believed an individual could only develop their capabilities and individual characteristics within the framework of the individual's racial membership; the race one belonged to determined whether or not one was worthy of moral care. The Christian concept of self-denial was to be replaced with the idea of self-assertion towards those deemed inferior. Natural selection and the struggle for existence were declared by the Nazis to be the most divine laws; peoples and individuals deemed inferior were said to be incapable of surviving without those deemed superior, yet by doing so they imposed a burden on the superior. Natural selection was deemed to favour the strong over the weak and the Nazis deemed that protecting those declared inferior was preventing nature from taking its course; those incapable of asserting themselves were viewed as doomed to annihilation, with the right to life being granted only to those who could survive on their own.

Irredentism and expansionism 

The German Nazi Party supported German irredentist claims to Austria, Alsace-Lorraine, the region now known as the Czech Republic and the territory known since 1919 as the Polish Corridor. A major policy of the German Nazi Party was Lebensraum ("living space") for the German nation based on claims that Germany after World War I was facing an overpopulation crisis and that expansion was needed to end the country's overpopulation within existing confined territory, and provide resources necessary to its people's well-being. Since the 1920s, the Nazi Party publicly promoted the expansion of Germany into territories held by the Soviet Union.

In Mein Kampf, Hitler stated that Lebensraum would be acquired in Eastern Europe, especially Russia. In his early years as the Nazi leader, Hitler had claimed that he would be willing to accept friendly relations with Russia on the tactical condition that Russia agree to return to the borders established by the German–Russian peace agreement of the Treaty of Brest-Litovsk signed by Grigori Sokolnikov of the Russian Soviet Republic in 1918 which gave large territories held by Russia to German control in exchange for peace. In 1921, Hitler had commended the Treaty of Brest-Litovsk as opening the possibility for restoration of relations between Germany and Russia by saying:

From 1921 to 1922, Hitler evoked rhetoric of both the achievement of Lebensraum involving the acceptance of a territorially reduced Russia as well as supporting Russian nationalists in overthrowing the Bolsheviks and establishing a new White Russian government. Hitler's attitudes changed by the end of 1922, in which he then supported an alliance of Germany with Britain to destroy Russia. Hitler later declared how far he intended to expand Germany into Russia:

Policy for Lebensraum planned mass expansion of Germany's borders to eastwards of the Ural Mountains. Hitler planned for the "surplus" Russian population living west of the Urals to be deported to the east of the Urals.

Historian Adam Tooze explains that Hitler believed that lebensraum was vital to securing American-style consumer affluence for the German people. In this light, Tooze argues that the view that the regime faced a "guns or butter" contrast is mistaken. While it is true that resources were diverted from civilian consumption to military production, Tooze explains that at a strategic level "guns were ultimately viewed as a means to obtaining more butter."

While the Nazi pre-occupation with agrarian living and food production are often seen as a sign of their backwardness, Tooze explains this was in fact a major driving issue in European society for at least the last two centuries. The issue of how European societies should respond to the new global economy in food was one of the major issues facing Europe in the early 20th century. Agrarian life in Europe (except perhaps with the exception of Britain) was incredibly common—in the early 1930s, over 9 million Germans (almost a third of the work force) were still working in agriculture and many people not working in agriculture still had small allotments or otherwise grew their own food. Tooze estimates that just over half the German population in the 1930s was living in towns and villages with populations under 20,000 people. Many people in cities still had memories of rural-urban migration—Tooze thus explains that the Nazis obsessions with agrarianism were not an atavistic gloss on a modern industrial nation but a consequence of the fact that Nazism (as both an ideology and as a movement) was the product of a society still in economic transition.

The Nazis obsession with food production was a consequence of the First World War. While Europe was able to avert famine with international imports, blockades brought the issue of food security back into European politics, the Allied blockade of Germany in and after World War I did not cause an outright famine but chronic malnutrition did kill an estimated 600,000 people in Germany and Austria. The economic crises of the interwar period meant that most Germans had memories of acute hunger. Thus Tooze concludes that the Nazis obsession with acquiring land was not a case of "turning back the clock" but more a refusal to accept that the result of the distribution of land, resources and population, which had resulted from the imperialist wars of the 18th and 19th centuries, should be accepted as final. While the victors of the First World War had either suitable agricultural land to population ratios or large empires (or both), allowing them to declare the issue of living space closed, the Nazis, knowing Germany lacked either of these, refused to accept that Germany's place in the world was to be a medium-sized workshop dependent upon imported food.

According to Goebbels, the conquest of Lebensraum was intended as an initial step towards the final goal of Nazi ideology, which was the establishment of complete German global hegemony. Rudolf Hess relayed to Walter Hewel Hitler's belief that world peace could only be acquired "when one power, the racially best one, has attained uncontested supremacy". When this control would be achieved, this power could then set up for itself a world police and assure itself "the necessary living space. [...] The lower races will have to restrict themselves accordingly".

Racial theories 
In its racial categorisation, Nazism viewed what it called the Aryan race as the master race of the world—a race that was superior to all other races. It viewed Aryans as being in racial conflict with a mixed race people, the Jews, whom the Nazis identified as a dangerous enemy of the Aryans. It also viewed a number of other peoples as dangerous to the well-being of the Aryan race. In order to preserve the perceived racial purity of the Aryan race, a set of race laws was introduced in 1935 which came to be known as the Nuremberg Laws. At first these laws only prevented sexual relations and marriages between Germans and Jews, but they were later extended to the "Gypsies, Negroes, and their bastard offspring", who were described by the Nazis as people of "alien blood". Such relations between Aryans (cf. Aryan certificate) and non-Aryans were now punishable under the race laws as Rassenschande or "race defilement". After the war began, the race defilement law was extended to include all foreigners (non-Germans). At the bottom of the racial scale of non-Aryans were Jews, Romanis, Slavs and blacks. To maintain the "purity and strength" of the Aryan race, the Nazis eventually sought to exterminate Jews, Romani, Slavs and the physically and mentally disabled. Other groups deemed "degenerate" and "asocial" who were not targeted for extermination, but were subjected to exclusionary treatment by the Nazi state, included homosexuals, blacks, Jehovah's Witnesses and political opponents. One of Hitler's ambitions at the start of the war was to exterminate, expel or enslave most or all Slavs from Central and Eastern Europe in order to acquire living space for German settlers.

A Nazi-era school textbook for German students entitled Heredity and Racial Biology for Students written by Jakob Graf described to students the Nazi conception of the Aryan race in a section titled "The Aryan: The Creative Force in Human History". Graf claimed that the original Aryans developed from Nordic peoples who invaded Ancient India and launched the initial development of Aryan culture there that later spread to ancient Persia and he claimed that the Aryan presence in Persia was what was responsible for its development into an empire. He claimed that ancient Greek culture was developed by Nordic peoples due to paintings of the time which showed Greeks who were tall, light-skinned, light-eyed, blond-haired people. He said that the Roman Empire was developed by the Italics who were related to the Celts who were also a Nordic people. He believed that the vanishing of the Nordic component of the populations in Ancient Greece and Ancient Rome led to their downfall. The Renaissance was claimed to have developed in the Western Roman Empire because of the Migration Period that brought new Nordic blood to the Empire's lands, such as the presence of Nordic blood in the Lombards (referred to as Longobards in the book); that remnants of the Visigoths were responsible for the creation of the Spanish Empire; and that the heritage of the Franks, Goths and Germanic peoples in France was what was responsible for its rise as a major power. He claimed that the rise of the Russian Empire was due to its leadership by people of Norman descent. He described the rise of Anglo-Saxon societies in North America, South Africa and Australia as being the result of the Nordic heritage of Anglo-Saxons. He concluded these points by saying: "Everywhere Nordic creative power has built mighty empires with high-minded ideas, and to this very day Aryan languages and cultural values are spread over a large part of the world, though the creative Nordic blood has long since vanished in many places".

In Nazi Germany, the idea of creating a master race resulted in efforts to "purify" the Deutsche Volk through eugenics and its culmination was the compulsory sterilisation or the involuntary euthanasia of physically or mentally disabled people. After World War II, the euthanasia programme was named Action T4. The ideological justification for euthanasia was Hitler's view of Sparta (11th century – 195 BC) as the original völkisch state and he praised Sparta's dispassionate destruction of congenitally deformed infants in order to maintain racial purity. Some non-Aryans enlisted in Nazi organisations like the Hitler Youth and the Wehrmacht, including Germans of African descent and Jewish descent. The Nazis began to implement "racial hygiene" policies as soon as they came to power. The July 1933 "Law for the Prevention of Hereditarily Diseased Offspring" prescribed compulsory sterilisation for people with a range of conditions which were thought to be hereditary, such as schizophrenia, epilepsy, Huntington's chorea and "imbecility". Sterilization was also mandated for chronic alcoholism and other forms of social deviance. An estimated 360,000 people were sterilised under this law between 1933 and 1939. Although some Nazis suggested that the programme should be extended to people with physical disabilities, such ideas had to be expressed carefully, given the fact that some Nazis had physical disabilities, one example being one of the most powerful figures of the regime, Joseph Goebbels, who had a deformed right leg.

Nazi racial theorist Hans F. K. Günther argued that European peoples were divided into five races: Nordic, Mediterranean, Dinaric, Alpine and East Baltic. Günther applied a Nordicist conception in order to justify his belief that Nordics were the highest in the racial hierarchy. In his book Rassenkunde des deutschen Volkes (1922) ("Racial Science of the German People"), Günther recognised Germans as being composed of all five races, but emphasised the strong Nordic heritage among them. Hitler read Rassenkunde des deutschen Volkes, which influenced his racial policy. Gunther believed that Slavs belonged to an "Eastern race" and he warned against Germans mixing with them. The Nazis described Jews as being a racially mixed group of primarily Near Eastern and Oriental racial types. Because such racial groups were concentrated outside Europe, the Nazis claimed that Jews were "racially alien" to all European peoples and that they did not have deep racial roots in Europe.

Günther emphasised Jews' Near Eastern racial heritage. Günther identified the mass conversion of the Khazars to Judaism in the 8th century as creating the two major branches of the Jewish people: those of primarily Near Eastern racial heritage became the Ashkenazi Jews (that he called Eastern Jews) while those of primarily Oriental racial heritage became the Sephardi Jews (that he called Southern Jews). Günther claimed that the Near Eastern type was composed of commercially spirited and artful traders, and that the type held strong psychological manipulation skills which aided them in trade. He claimed that the Near Eastern race had been "bred not so much for the conquest and exploitation of nature as it had been for the conquest and exploitation of people". Günther believed that European peoples had a racially motivated aversion to peoples of Near Eastern racial origin and their traits, and as evidence of this he showed multiple examples of depictions of satanic figures with Near Eastern physiognomies in European art.

Hitler's conception of the Aryan Herrenvolk ("Aryan master race") excluded the vast majority of Slavs from Central and Eastern Europe (i.e. Poles, Russians, Ukrainians, etc.). They were regarded as a race of men not inclined to a higher form of civilisation, which was under an instinctive force that reverted them back to nature. The Nazis also regarded the Slavs as having dangerous Jewish and Asiatic, meaning Mongol, influences. Because of this, the Nazis declared Slavs to be Untermenschen ("subhumans"). Nazi anthropologists attempted to scientifically prove the historical admixture of the Slavs who lived further East and leading Nazi racial theorist Hans Günther regarded the Slavs as being primarily Nordic centuries ago but he believed that they had mixed with non-Nordic types over time. Exceptions were made for a small percentage of Slavs who the Nazis saw as descended from German settlers and therefore fit to be Germanised and considered part of the Aryan master race. Hitler described Slavs as "a mass of born slaves who feel the need for a master". The Nazi notion of Slavs as inferior served as a legitimisation of their desire to create Lebensraum for Germans and other Germanic people in eastern Europe, where millions of Germans and other Germanic settlers would be moved into once those territories were conquered, while the original Slavic inhabitants were to be annihilated, removed or enslaved. Nazi Germany's policy changed towards Slavs in response to military manpower shortages, forced it to allow Slavs to serve in its armed forces within the occupied territories in spite of the fact that they were considered "subhuman".

Hitler declared that racial conflict against Jews was necessary in order to save Germany from suffering under them and he dismissed concerns that the conflict with them was inhumane and unjust:

We may be inhumane, but if we rescue Germany we have achieved the greatest deed in the world. We may work injustice, but if we rescue Germany then we have removed the greatest injustice in the world. We may be immoral, but if our people is rescued we have opened the way for morality.

Nazi propagandist Joseph Goebbels frequently employed antisemitic rhetoric to underline this view: "The Jew is the enemy and the destroyer of the purity of blood, the conscious destroyer of our race."

Social class 
National Socialist politics was based on competition and struggle as its organising principle, and the Nazis believed that "human life consisted of eternal struggle and competition and derived its meaning from struggle and competition." The Nazis saw this eternal struggle in military terms, and advocated a society organised like an army in order to achieve success. They promoted the idea of a national-racial "people's community" (Volksgemeinschaft) in order to accomplish "the efficient prosecution of the struggle against other peoples and states." Like an army, the Volksgemeinschaft was meant to consist of a hierarchy of ranks or classes of people, some commanding and others obeying, all working together for a common goal. This concept was rooted in the writings of 19th century völkisch authors who glorified medieval German society, viewing it as a "community rooted in the land and bound together by custom and tradition," in which there was neither class conflict nor selfish individualism. The Nazis concept of the volksgemeinschaft appealed to many, as it was seen as it seemed at once to affirm a commitment to a new type of society for the modern age yet also offer protection from the tensions and insecurities of modernisation. It would balance individual achievement with group solidarity and cooperation with competition. Stripped of its ideological overtones, the Nazi vision of modernisation without internal conflict and a political community that offered both security and opportunity was so potent a vision of the future that many Germans were willing to overlook its racist and anti-Semitic essence.

Nazism rejected the Marxist concept of class conflict, and it praised both German capitalists and German workers as essential to the Volksgemeinschaft. In the Volksgemeinschaft, social classes would continue to exist, but there would be no class conflict between them. Hitler said that "the capitalists have worked their way to the top through their capacity, and as the basis of this selection, which again only proves their higher race, they have a right to lead." German business leaders co-operated with the Nazis during their rise to power and received substantial benefits from the Nazi state after it was established, including high profits and state-sanctioned monopolies and cartels. Large celebrations and symbolism were used extensively to encourage those engaged in physical labour on behalf of Germany, with leading National Socialists often praising the "honour of labour", which fostered a sense of community (Gemeinschaft) for the German people and promoted solidarity towards the Nazi cause. To win workers away from Marxism, Nazi propaganda sometimes presented its expansionist foreign policy goals as a "class struggle between nations." Bonfires were made of school children's differently coloured caps as symbolic of the unity of different social classes.

In 1922, Hitler disparaged other nationalist and racialist political parties as disconnected from the mass populace, especially lower and working-class young people:

Nevertheless, the Nazi Party's voter base consisted mainly of farmers and the middle class, including groups such as Weimar government officials, school teachers, doctors, clerks, self-employed businessmen, salesmen, retired officers, engineers, and students. Their demands included lower taxes, higher prices for food, restrictions on department stores and consumer co-operatives, and reductions in social services and wages. The need to maintain the support of these groups made it difficult for the Nazis to appeal to the working class, since the working class often had opposite demands.

From 1928 onward, the Nazi Party's growth into a large national political movement was dependent on middle class support, and on the public perception that it "promised to side with the middle classes and to confront the economic and political power of the working class." The financial collapse of the white collar middle-class of the 1920s figures much in their strong support of Nazism. Although the Nazis continued to make appeals to "the German worker", historian Timothy Mason concludes that "Hitler had nothing but slogans to offer the working class." Historians Conan Fischer and Detlef Mühlberger argue that while the Nazis were primarily rooted in the lower middle class, they were able to appeal to all classes in society and that while workers were generally underrepresented, they were still a substantial source of support for the Nazis. H.L. Ansbacher argues that the working-class soldiers had the most faith in Hitler out of any occupational group in Germany.

The Nazis also established a norm that every worker should be semi-skilled, which was not simply rhetorical; the number of men leaving school to enter the work force as unskilled labourers fell from 200,000 in 1934 to 30,000 in 1939. For many working-class families, the 1930s and 1940s were a time of social mobility; not in the sense of moving into the middle class but rather moving within the blue-collar skill hierarchy. Overall, the experience of workers varied considerably under Nazism. Workers wages did not increase much during Nazi rule, as the government feared wage-price inflation and thus wage growth was limited. Prices for food and clothing rose, though costs for heating, rent and light decreased. Skilled workers were in shortage from 1936 onward, meaning that workers who engaged in vocational training could look forward to considerably higher wages. Benefits provided by the Labour Front were generally positively received, even if workers did not always buy in to propaganda about the volksgemeinschaft. Workers welcomed opportunities for employment after the harsh years of the Great Depression, creating a common belief that the Nazis had removed the insecurity of unemployment. Workers who remained discontented risked the Gestapo's informants. Ultimately, the Nazis faced a conflict between their rearmament program, which by necessity would require material sacrifices from workers (longer hours and a lower standard of living), versus a need to maintain the confidence of the working class in the regime. Hitler was sympathetic to the view that stressed taking further measures for rearmament but he did not fully implement the measures required for it in order to avoid alienating the working class.

While the Nazis had substantial support amongst the middle-class, they often attacked traditional middle-class values and Hitler personally held great contempt for them. This was because the traditional image of the middle class was one that was obsessed with personal status, material attainment and quiet, comfortable living, which was in opposition to the Nazism's ideal of a New Man. The Nazis' New Man was envisioned as a heroic figure who rejected a materialistic and private life for a public life and a pervasive sense of duty, willing to sacrifice everything for the nation. Despite the Nazis' contempt for these values, they were still able to secure millions of middle-class votes. Hermann Beck argues that while some members of the middle-class dismissed this as mere rhetoric, many others in some ways agreed with the Nazis—the defeat of 1918 and the failures of the Weimar period caused many middle-class Germans to question their own identity, thinking their traditional values to be anachronisms and agreeing with the Nazis that these values were no longer viable. While this rhetoric would become less frequent after 1933 due to the increased emphasis on the volksgemeinschaft, it and its ideas would never truly disappear until the overthrow of the regime. The Nazis instead emphasised that the middle-class must become staatsbürger, a publicly active and involved citizen, rather than a selfish, materialistic spießbürger, who was only interested in private life.

Sex and gender 

Nazi ideology advocated excluding women from political involvement and confining them to the spheres of "Kinder, Küche, Kirche" (Children, Kitchen, Church). Many women enthusiastically supported the regime, but formed their own internal hierarchies. Hitler's own opinion on the matter of women in Nazi Germany was that while other eras of German history had experienced the development and liberation of the female mind, the National Socialist goal was essentially singular in that it wished for them to produce a child. Based on this theme, Hitler once remarked about women that "with every child that she brings into the world, she fights her battle for the nation. The man stands up for the Volk, exactly as the woman stands up for the family". Proto-natalist programs in Nazi Germany offered favourable loans and grants to newlyweds and encouraged them to give birth to offspring by providing them with additional incentives. Contraception was discouraged for racially valuable women in Nazi Germany and abortion was forbidden by strict legal mandates, including prison sentences for women who sought them as well as prison sentences for doctors who performed them, whereas abortion for racially "undesirable" persons was encouraged.

While unmarried until the very end of the regime, Hitler often made excuses about his busy life hindering any chance for marriage. Among National Socialist ideologues, marriage was valued not for moral considerations but because it provided an optimal breeding environment. Reichsführer-SS Heinrich Himmler reportedly told a confidant that when he established the Lebensborn program, an organisation that would dramatically increase the birth rate of "Aryan" children through extramarital relations between women classified as racially pure and their male equals, he had only the purest male "conception assistants" in mind.

Since the Nazis extended the Rassenschande ("race defilement") law to all foreigners at the beginning of the war, pamphlets were issued to German women which ordered them to avoid sexual relations with foreign workers who were brought to Germany and the pamphlets also ordered German women to view these same foreign workers as a danger to their blood. Although the law was applicable to both genders, German women were punished more severely for having sexual relations with foreign forced labourers in Germany. The Nazis issued the Polish decrees on 8 March 1940 which contained regulations concerning the Polish forced labourers (Zivilarbeiter) who were brought to Germany during World War II. One of the regulations stated that any Pole "who has sexual relations with a German man or woman, or approaches them in any other improper manner, will be punished by death". After the decrees were enacted, Himmler stated:

The Nazis later issued similar regulations against the Eastern Workers (Ost-Arbeiter), including the imposition of the death penalty if they engaged in sexual relations with German persons. Heydrich issued a decree on 20 February 1942 which declared that sexual intercourse between a German woman and a Russian worker or prisoner of war would result in the Russian man being punished with the death penalty. Another decree issued by Himmler on 7 December 1942 stated that any "unauthorised sexual intercourse" would result in the death penalty. Because the Law for the Protection of German Blood and German Honour did not permit capital punishment for race defilement, special courts were convened in order to allow the death penalty to be imposed in some cases. German women accused of race defilement were marched through the streets with their head shaven and placards detailing their crimes were placed around their necks and those convicted of race defilement were sent to concentration camps. When Himmler reportedly asked Hitler what the punishment should be for German girls and German women who were found guilty of race defilement with prisoners of war (POWs), he ordered that "every POW who has relations with a German girl or a German would be shot" and the German woman should be publicly humiliated by "having her hair shorn and being sent to a concentration camp".

The League of German Girls was particularly regarded as instructing girls to avoid race defilement, which was treated with particular importance for young females.

Opposition to homosexuality 

After the Night of the Long Knives, Hitler promoted Himmler and the SS, who then zealously suppressed homosexuality by saying: "We must exterminate these people root and branch ... the homosexual must be eliminated". In 1936, Himmler established the "Reichszentrale zur Bekämpfung der Homosexualität und Abtreibung" ("Reich Central Office for the Combating of Homosexuality and Abortion"). The Nazi regime incarcerated some 100,000 homosexuals during the 1930s. As concentration camp prisoners, homosexual men were forced to wear pink triangle badges. Nazi ideology still viewed German men who were gay as a part of the Aryan master race, but the Nazi regime attempted to force them into sexual and social conformity. Homosexuals were viewed as failing in their duty to procreate and reproduce for the Aryan nation. Gay men who would not change or feign a change in their sexual orientation were sent to concentration camps under the "Extermination Through Work" campaign.

Religion 

The Nazi Party Programme of 1920 guaranteed freedom for all religious denominations which were not hostile to the State and it also endorsed Positive Christianity in order to combat "the Jewish-materialist spirit". Positive Christianity was a modified version of Christianity which emphasised racial purity and nationalism. The Nazis were aided by theologians such as Ernst Bergmann. In his work Die 25 Thesen der Deutschreligion (Twenty-five Points of the German Religion), Bergmann held the view that the Old Testament of the Bible was inaccurate along with portions of the New Testament, claimed that Jesus was not a Jew but was instead of Aryan origin and he also claimed that Adolf Hitler was the new messiah.

Hitler denounced the Old Testament as "Satan's Bible" and using components of the New Testament he attempted to prove that Jesus was both an Aryan and an antisemite by citing passages such as John 8:44 where he noted that Jesus is yelling at "the Jews", as well as saying to them "your father is the devil" and the Cleansing of the Temple, which describes Jesus' whipping of the "Children of the Devil". Hitler claimed that the New Testament included distortions by Paul the Apostle, who Hitler described as a "mass-murderer turned saint". In their propaganda, the Nazis used the writings of Martin Luther, the Protestant Reformer. They publicly displayed an original edition of Luther's On the Jews and their Lies during the annual Nuremberg rallies. The Nazis endorsed the pro-Nazi Protestant German Christians organisation.

The Nazis were initially very hostile to Catholics because most Catholics supported the German Centre Party. Catholics opposed the Nazis' promotion of compulsory sterilisation of those whom they deemed inferior and the Catholic Church forbade its members to vote for the Nazis. In 1933, extensive Nazi violence occurred against Catholics due to their association with the Centre Party and their opposition to the Nazi regime's sterilisation laws. The Nazis demanded that Catholics declare their loyalty to the German state. In their propaganda, the Nazis used elements of Germany's Catholic history, in particular the German Catholic Teutonic Knights and their campaigns in Eastern Europe. The Nazis identified them as "sentinels" in the East against "Slavic chaos", though beyond that symbolism, the influence of the Teutonic Knights on Nazism was limited. Hitler also admitted that the Nazis' night rallies were inspired by the Catholic rituals which he had witnessed during his Catholic upbringing. The Nazis did seek official reconciliation with the Catholic Church and they endorsed the creation of the pro-Nazi Catholic Kreuz und Adler, an organisation which advocated a form of national Catholicism that would reconcile the Catholic Church's beliefs with Nazism. On 20 July 1933, a concordat (Reichskonkordat) was signed between Nazi Germany and the Catholic Church, which in exchange for acceptance of the Catholic Church in Germany required German Catholics to be loyal to the German state. The Catholic Church then ended its ban on members supporting the Nazi Party.

During the Second World War and the fanaticization of National Socialism, priests and nuns increasingly came into the focus of the Gestapo and the SS. In the concentration camps, separate priestly blocks were formed and any church resistance was strictly persecuted. The monastery sister Maria Restituta Kafka was sentenced to death by the People's Court and executed only for a harmless song critical of the regime. Polish priests came en masse to the Auschwitz concentration camp. Catholic resistance groups like those around Roman Karl Scholz were persecuted uncompromisingly. While the Catholic resistance was often anti-war and passive, there are also examples of actively combating National Socialism. The group around the priest Heinrich Maier approached the American secret service and provided them with plans and location sketches of for V-2 rockets, Tiger tanks, Messerschmitt Bf 109 and Messerschmitt Me 163 Komet and their production sites so that they could successfully bomb the factories. After the war, their history was often forgotten, also because they acted against the express instructions of their church authorities.

Historian Michael Burleigh claims that Nazism used Christianity for political purposes, but such use required that "fundamental tenets were stripped out, but the remaining diffuse religious emotionality had its uses". Burleigh claims that Nazism's conception of spirituality was "self-consciously pagan and primitive". Historian Roger Griffin rejects the claim that Nazism was primarily pagan, noting that although there were some influential neo-paganists in the Nazi Party, such as Heinrich Himmler and Alfred Rosenberg, they represented a minority and their views did not influence Nazi ideology beyond its use for symbolism. It is noted that Hitler denounced Germanic paganism in Mein Kampf and condemned Rosenberg's and Himmler's paganism as "nonsense".

Economics 

The Nazis came to power in the midst of Great Depression, when the unemployment rate at that point in time was close to 30%. Generally speaking, Nazi theorists and politicians blamed Germany's previous economic failures on political causes like the influence of Marxism on the workforce, the sinister and exploitative machinations of what they called international Jewry and the vindictiveness of the western political leaders' war reparation demands. Instead of traditional economic incentives, the Nazis offered solutions of a political nature, such as the elimination of organised trade unions, rearmament (in contravention of the Versailles Treaty) and biological politics. Various work programs designed to establish full-employment for the German population were instituted once the Nazis seized full national power. Hitler encouraged nationally supported projects like the construction of the Autobahn highway system, the introduction of an affordable people's car (Volkswagen) and later the Nazis bolstered the economy through the business and employment generated by military rearmament. The Nazis benefited early in the regime's existence from the first post-Depression economic upswing, and this combined with their public works projects, job-procurement program and subsidised home repair program reduced unemployment by as much as 40 per cent in one year. This development tempered the unfavourable psychological climate caused by the earlier economic crisis and encouraged Germans to march in step with the regime. The economic policies of the Nazis were in many respects a continuation of the policies of the German National People's Party, a national-conservative party and the Nazis' coalition partner. While other Western capitalist countries strove for increased state ownership of industry during the same period, the Nazis transferred public ownership into the private sector and handed over some public services to private organizations, mostly affiliated with the Nazi Party. It was an intentional policy with multiple objectives rather than ideologically driven and was used as a tool to enhance support for the Nazi government and the party. According to historian Richard Overy, the Nazi war economy was a mixed economy that combined free markets with central planning and described the economy as being somewhere in between the command economy of the Soviet Union and the capitalist system of the United States.

The Nazi government continued the economic policies introduced by the government of Kurt von Schleicher in 1932 to combat the effects of the Depression. Upon being appointed Chancellor in 1933, Hitler appointed Hjalmar Schacht, a former member of the German Democratic Party, as President of the Reichsbank in 1933 and Minister of Economics in 1934. Hitler promised measures to increase employment, protect the German currency, and promote recovery from the Great Depression. These included an agrarian settlement program, labour service, and a guarantee to maintain health care and pensions. However, these policies and programs, which included a large public works programs supported by deficit spending such as the construction of the Autobahn network to stimulate the economy and reduce unemployment, were inherited and planned to be undertaken by the Weimar Republic during conservative Paul von Hindenburg's presidency and which the Nazis appropriated as their own after coming to power. Above all, Hitler's priority was rearmament and the buildup of the German military in preparation for an eventual war to conquer Lebensraum in the East. The policies of Schacht created a scheme for deficit financing, in which capital projects were paid for with the issuance of promissory notes called Mefo bills, which could be traded by companies with each other. This was particularly useful in allowing Germany to rearm because the Mefo bills were not Reichsmarks and did not appear in the federal budget, so they helped conceal rearmament. At the beginning of his rule, Hitler said that "the future of Germany depends exclusively and only on the reconstruction of the Wehrmacht. All other tasks must cede precedence to the task of rearmament." This policy was implemented immediately, with military expenditures quickly growing far larger than the civilian work-creation programs. As early as June 1933, military spending for the year was budgeted to be three times larger than the spending on all civilian work-creation measures in 1932 and 1933 combined. Nazi Germany increased its military spending faster than any other state in peacetime, with the share of military spending rising from 1 per cent to 10 per cent of national income in the first two years of the regime alone. Eventually, it reached as high as 75 per cent by 1944.

In spite of their rhetoric condemning big business prior to their rise to power, the Nazis quickly entered into a partnership with German business from as early as February 1933. That month, after being appointed Chancellor but before gaining dictatorial powers, Hitler made a personal appeal to German business leaders to help fund the Nazi Party for the crucial months that were to follow. He argued that they should support him in establishing a dictatorship because "private enterprise cannot be maintained in the age of democracy" and because democracy would allegedly lead to communism. He promised to destroy the German left and the trade unions, without any mention of anti-Jewish policies or foreign conquests. In the following weeks, the Nazi Party received contributions from seventeen different business groups, with the largest coming from IG Farben and Deutsche Bank. Historian Adam Tooze writes that the leaders of German business were therefore "willing partners in the destruction of political pluralism in Germany". In exchange, owners and managers of German businesses were granted unprecedented powers to control their workforce, collective bargaining was abolished and wages were frozen at a relatively low level. Business profits also rose very rapidly, as did corporate investment. In addition, the Nazis privatised public properties and public services, only increasing economic state control through regulations. Hitler believed that private ownership was useful in that it encouraged creative competition and technical innovation, but insisted that it had to conform to national interests and be "productive" rather than "parasitical". Private property rights were conditional upon following the economic priorities set by the Nazi leadership, with high profits as a reward for firms who followed them and the threat of nationalisation being used against those who did not. Under Nazi economics, free competition and self-regulating markets diminished, but Hitler's social Darwinist beliefs made him retain business competition and private property as economic engines.

The Nazis were hostile to the idea of social welfare in principle, upholding instead the social Darwinist concept that the weak and feeble should perish. They condemned the welfare system of the Weimar Republic as well as private charity, accusing them of supporting people regarded as racially inferior and weak, who should have been weeded out in the process of natural selection. Nevertheless, faced with the mass unemployment and poverty of the Great Depression, the Nazis found it necessary to set up charitable institutions to help racially-pure Germans in order to maintain popular support, while arguing that this represented "racial self-help" and not indiscriminate charity or universal social welfare. Nazi programs such as the Winter Relief of the German People and the broader National Socialist People's Welfare (NSV) were organised as quasi-private institutions, officially relying on private donations from Germans to help others of their race, although in practice those who refused to donate could face severe consequences. Unlike the social welfare institutions of the Weimar Republic and the Christian charities, the NSV distributed assistance on explicitly racial grounds. It provided support only to those who were "racially sound, capable of and willing to work, politically reliable, and willing and able to reproduce." Non-Aryans were excluded, as well as the "work-shy", "asocials" and the "hereditarily ill." Successful efforts were made to get middle-class women involved in social work assisting large families, and the Winter Relief campaigns acted as a ritual to generate public sympathy.

Agrarian policies were also important to the Nazis since they corresponded not just to the economy but to their geopolitical conception of Lebensraum as well. For Hitler, the acquisition of land and soil was requisite in moulding the German economy. To tie farmers to their land, selling agricultural land was prohibited. Farm ownership remained private, but business monopoly rights were granted to marketing boards to control production and prices with a quota system. The Hereditary Farm Law of 1933 established a cartel structure under a government body known as the Reichsnährstand (RNST) which determined "everything from what seeds and fertilizers were used to how land was inherited". Hitler primarily viewed the German economy as an instrument of power and believed the economy was not about creating wealth and technical progress so as to improve the quality of life for a nation's citizenry, but rather that economic success was paramount for providing the means and material foundations necessary for military conquest. While economic progress generated by National Socialist programs had its role in appeasing the German people, the Nazis and Hitler in particular did not believe that economic solutions alone were sufficient to thrust Germany onto the stage as a world power. The Nazis thus sought to secure a general economic revival accompanied by massive military spending for rearmament, especially later through the implementation of the Four Year Plan, which consolidated their rule and firmly secured a command relationship between the German arms industry and the National Socialist government. Between 1933 and 1939, military expenditures were upwards of 82 billion Reichsmarks and represented 23 per cent of Germany's gross national product as the Nazis mobilised their people and economy for war.

Anti-communism 

The Nazis claimed that communism was dangerous to the well-being of nations because of its intention to dissolve private property, its support of class conflict, its aggression against the middle class, its hostility towards small business and its atheism. Nazism rejected class conflict-based socialism and economic egalitarianism, favouring instead a stratified economy with social classes based on merit and talent, retaining private property and the creation of national solidarity that transcends class distinction. Historians Ian Kershaw and Joachim Fest argue that in post–World War I Germany, the Nazis were one of many nationalist and fascist political parties contending for the leadership of Germany's anti-communist movement.

In Mein Kampf, Hitler stated his desire to "make war upon the Marxist principle that all men are equal." He believed that "the notion of equality was a sin against nature." Nazism upheld the "natural inequality of men," including inequality between races and also within each race. The National Socialist state aimed to advance those individuals with special talents or intelligence, so they could rule over the masses. Nazi ideology relied on elitism and the Führerprinzip (leadership principle), arguing that elite minorities should assume leadership roles over the majority, and that the elite minority should itself be organised according to a "hierarchy of talent", with a single leader—the Führer—at the top. The Führerprinzip held that each member of the hierarchy owed absolute obedience to those above him and should hold absolute power over those below him.

During the 1920s, Hitler urged disparate Nazi factions to unite in opposition to Jewish Bolshevism. Hitler asserted that the "three vices" of "Jewish Marxism" were democracy, pacifism and internationalism. The Communist movement, the trade unions, the Social Democratic Party and the left-wing press were all considered to be Jewish-controlled and part of the "international Jewish conspiracy" to weaken the German nation by promoting internal disunity through class struggle. The Nazis also believed that the Jews had instigated the Bolshevik revolution in Russia and that Communists had stabbed Germany in the back and caused it to lose the First World War. They further argued that modern cultural trends of the 1920s (such as jazz music and cubist art) represented "cultural Bolshevism" and were part of a political assault aimed at the spiritual degeneration of the German Volk. Joseph Goebbels published a pamphlet titled The Nazi-Sozi which gave brief points of how National Socialism differed from Marxism. In 1930, Hitler said: "Our adopted term 'Socialist' has nothing to do with Marxist Socialism. Marxism is anti-property; true Socialism is not".

The Communist Party of Germany (KPD) was the largest Communist Party in the world outside of the Soviet Union, until it was destroyed by the Nazis in 1933. In the 1920s and early 1930s, Communists and Nazis often fought each other directly in street violence, with the Nazi paramilitary organisations being opposed by the Communist Red Front and Anti-Fascist Action. After the beginning of the Great Depression, both Communists and Nazis saw their share of the vote increase. While the Nazis were willing to form alliances with other parties of the right, the Communists refused to form an alliance with the Social Democratic Party of Germany, the largest party of the left. After the Nazis came to power, they quickly banned the Communist Party under the allegation that it was preparing for revolution and that it had caused the Reichstag fire. Four thousand KPD officials were arrested in February 1933, and by the end of the year 130,000 communists had been sent to Nazi concentration camps.

During the late 1930s and the 1940s, anti-communist regimes and groups that supported Nazism included the Falange in Francoist Spain, the Vichy regime and the 33rd Waffen Grenadier Division of the SS Charlemagne (1st French) in France and the British Union of Fascists under Oswald Mosley.

Views of capitalism 

The Nazis argued that free-market capitalism damages nations due to international finance and the worldwide economic dominance of disloyal big business, which they considered to be the product of Jewish influences. Nazi propaganda posters in working class districts emphasised anti-capitalism, such as one that said: "The maintenance of a rotten industrial system has nothing to do with nationalism. I can love Germany and hate capitalism".

Both in public and in private Hitler opposed free-market capitalism because it "could not be trusted to put national interests first", arguing that it holds nations ransom in the interests of a parasitic cosmopolitan rentier class. He believed that international free trade would lead to global domination by the British Empire and the United States, which he believed were controlled by Jewish bankers in Wall Street and the City of London. In particular, Hitler saw the United States as a major future rival and feared that the globalization after World War I would allow North America to displace Europe as the world's most powerful continent. Hitler's anxiety over the economic rise of the United States was a major theme in his unpublished Zweites Buch. He even hoped for a time that Britain could be swayed into an alliance with Germany on the basis of a shared economic rivalry with the United States. Hitler desired an economy that would direct resources "in ways that matched the many national goals of the regime" such as the buildup of the military, building programs for cities and roads, and economic self-sufficiency. Hitler also distrusted free-market capitalism for being unreliable due to its egotism and preferred a state-directed economy that maintains private property and competition but subordinates them to the interests of the Volk and Nation.

Hitler told a party leader in 1934: "The economic system of our day is the creation of the Jews". Hitler said to Benito Mussolini that capitalism had "run its course". Hitler also said that the business bourgeoisie "know nothing except their profit. 'Fatherland' is only a word for them." Hitler was personally disgusted with the ruling bourgeois elites of Germany during the period of the Weimar Republic, whom he referred to as "cowardly shits".

In Mein Kampf, Hitler effectively supported mercantilism in the belief that economic resources from their respective territories should be seized by force, as he believed that the policy of Lebensraum would provide Germany with such economically valuable territories. He argued that the United States and the United Kingdom only benefitted from free trade because they had already conquered substantial internal markets through British colonial conquests and American westward expansion. Hitler argued that the only means to maintain economic security was to have direct control over resources rather than being forced to rely on world trade. Hitler claimed that war to gain such resources was the only means to surpass the failing capitalist economic system.

In practice, however, the Nazis merely opposed one type of capitalism, namely 19th-century free-market capitalism and the laissez-faire model, which they nonetheless applied to the social sphere in the form of social Darwinism. Some have described Nazi Germany as an example of corporatism, authoritarian capitalism, or totalitarian capitalism. While claiming to strive for autarky in propaganda, the Nazis crushed existing movements towards self-sufficiency and established extensive capital connections in efforts to ready for expansionist war and genocide in alliance with traditional business and commerce elites. In spite of their anti-capitalist rhetoric in opposition to big business, the Nazis allied with German business as soon as they got in power by appealing to the fear of communism and promising to destroy the German left and trade unions, eventually purging both more radical and reactionary elements from the party in 1934.

Joseph Goebbels, who would later go on to become the Nazi Propaganda Minister, was strongly opposed to both capitalism and communism, viewing them as the "two great pillars of materialism" that were "part of the international Jewish conspiracy for world domination." Nevertheless, he wrote in his diary in 1925 that if he were forced to choose between them, "in the final analysis, it would be better for us to go down with Bolshevism than live in eternal slavery under capitalism". Goebbels also linked his antisemitism to his anti-capitalism, stating in a 1929 pamphlet that "we see, in the Hebrews, the incarnation of capitalism, the misuse of the nation's goods."

Within the Nazi Party, the faction associated with anti-capitalist beliefs was the SA, a paramilitary wing led by Ernst Röhm. The SA had a complicated relationship with the rest of the party, giving both Röhm himself and local SA leaders significant autonomy. Different local leaders would even promote different political ideas in their units, including "nationalistic, socialistic, anti-Semitic, racist, völkisch, or conservative ideas." There was tension between the SA and Hitler, especially from 1930 onward, as Hitler's "increasingly close association with big industrial interests and traditional rightist forces" caused many in the SA to distrust him. The SA regarded Hitler's seizure of power in 1933 as a "first revolution" against the left, and some voices within the ranks began arguing for a "second revolution" against the right. After engaging in violence against the left in 1933, Röhm's SA also began attacks against individuals deemed to be associated with conservative reaction. Hitler saw Röhm's independent actions as violating and possibly threatening his leadership, as well as jeopardising the regime by alienating the conservative President Paul von Hindenburg and the conservative-oriented German Army. This resulted in Hitler purging Röhm and other radical members of the SA in 1934, during the Night of the Long Knives.

Totalitarianism 

Under Nazism, with its emphasis on the nation, individualism was denounced and instead importance was placed upon Germans belonging to the German Volk and "people's community" (Volksgemeinschaft). Hitler declared that "every activity and every need of every individual will be regulated by the collectivity represented by the party" and that "there are no longer any free realms in which the individual belongs to himself". Heinrich Himmler justified the establishment of a repressive police state, in which the security forces could exercise power arbitrarily, by claiming that national security and order should take precedence over the needs of the individual.

According to the famous philosopher and political theorist, Hannah Arendt, the allure of Nazism as a totalitarian ideology (with its attendant mobilisation of the German population) resided within the construct of helping that society deal with the cognitive dissonance resultant from the tragic interruption of the First World War and the economic and material suffering consequent to the Depression and brought to order the revolutionary unrest occurring all around them. Instead of the plurality that existed in democratic or parliamentary states, Nazism as a totalitarian system promulgated "clear" solutions to the historical problems faced by Germany, levied support by de-legitimizing the former government of Weimar and provided a politico-biological pathway to a better future, one free from the uncertainty of the past. It was the atomised and disaffected masses that Hitler and the party elite pointed in a particular direction and using clever propaganda to make them into ideological adherents, exploited in bringing Nazism to life.

While the ideologues of Nazism, much like those of Stalinism, abhorred democratic or parliamentary governance as practised in the United States or Britain, their differences are substantial. An epistemic crisis occurs when one tries to synthesize and contrast Nazism and Stalinism as two-sides of the same coin with their similarly tyrannical leaders, state-controlled economies and repressive police structures. Namely, while they share a common thematic political construction, they are entirely inimical to one another in their worldviews and when more carefully analysed against one another on a one-to-one level, an "irreconcilable asymmetry" results.

Classification: Reactionary or Revolutionary 
Although Nazism is often seen as a reactionary movement, it did not seek a return of Germany to the pre-Weimar monarchy, but instead looked much further back to a mythic halcyon Germany which never existed. It has also been seen—as it was by the German-American scholar Franz Leopold Neumann—as the result of a crisis of capitalism which manifested as a "totalitarian monopoly capitalism". In this view Nazism is a mass movement of the middle class which was in opposition to a mass movement of workers in socialism and its extreme form, Communism. Historian Karl Dietrich Bracher argues:

Such an interpretation runs the risk of misjudging the revolutionary component of National Socialism, which cannot be dismissed as being simply reactionary. Rather, from the very outset, and particularly as it developed into the SS state, National Socialism aimed at a transformation of state and society.

About Hitler's and the Nazi Party's political positions, Bracher further claims:

[They] were of a revolutionary nature: destruction of existing political and social structures and their supporting elites; profound disdain for civic order, for human and moral values, for Habsburg and Hohenzollern, for liberal and Marxist ideas. The middle class and middle-class values, bourgeois nationalism and capitalism, the professionals, the intelligentsia and the upper class were dealt the sharpest rebuff. These were the groups which had to be uprooted [...].

Similarly, historian Modris Eksteins argued:

Contrary to many interpretations of Nazism, which tend to view it as a reactionary movement, as, in the words of Thomas Mann, an "explosion of antiquarianism", intent on turning Germany into a pastoral folk community of thatched cottages and happy peasants, the general thrust of the movement, despite archaisms, was futuristic. Nazism was a headlong plunge into the future, towards a "brave new world." Of course it used to advantage residual conservative and utopian longings, paid respect to these romantic visions, and picked its ideological trappings from the German past. but its goals were, by its own lights, distinctly progressive. It was not a double-faced Janus whose aspects were equally attentive to the past and the future, nor was it a modern Proteus, the god of metamorphosis, who duplicates pre-existing forms. The intention of the movement was to create a new type of human being from whom would spring a new morality, a new social system, and eventually a new international order. That was, in fact, the intention of all the fascist movements. After a visit to Italy and a meeting with Mussolini, Oswald Mosley wrote that fascism "has produced not only a new system of government, but also a new type of man, who differs from politicians of the old world as men from another planet." Hitler talked in these terms endlessly. National Socialism was more than a political movement, he said; it was more than a faith; it was a desire to create mankind anew.

British historian Ian Kershaw, in his history of Europe in the first half of the 20th century, To Hell and Back, says about Nazism, Italian Fascism and Bolshevism:

They were different forms of a completely new, modern type of dictatorship – the complete antithesis to liberal democracy. They were all revolutionary, if by that term we understand a major political upheaval driven by the utopian aim of changing society fundamentally. They were not content simply to use repression as a means of control, but sought to mobilize behind an exclusive ideology to "educate" people into becoming committed believers, to claim them soul as well as body. Each of the regimes was, therefore, dynamic in ways that "conventional" authoritarianism was not.

After the failure of the Beer Hall Putsch in 1923, and his subsequent trial and imprisonment, Hitler decided that the way for the Nazi Party to achieve power was not through insurrection, but through legal and quasi-legal means. This did not sit well with the brown-shirted stormtroopers of the SA, especially those in Berlin, who chafed under the restrictions that Hitler placed on them, and their subordination to the party. This resulted in the Stennes Revolt of 1930–31, after which Hitler made himself the Supreme Commander of the SA, and brought Ernst Röhm back to be their Chief of Staff and keep them in line. The quashing of the SA's revolutionary fervor convinced many businessmen and military leaders that the Nazis had put aside their insurrectionist past, and that Hitler could be a reliable partner 

After the Nazis' "Seizure of Power" in 1933, Röhm and the Brown Shirts were not content for the party to simply carry the reins of power. Instead, they pressed for a continuation of the "National Socialist revolution" to bring about sweeping social changes, which Hitler, primarily for tactical reasons, was not willing to do at that time. He was instead focused on rebuilding the military and reorienting the economy to provide the rearmament necessary for invasion of the countries to the east of Germany, especially Poland and Russia, to get the Lebensraum ("living space") he believed was necessary to the survival of the Aryan race. For this, he needed the co-operation of not only the military, but also the vital organs of capitalism, the banks and big businesses, which he would be unlikely to get if Germany's social and economic structure was being radically overhauled. Röhm's public proclamation that the SA would not allow the "German Revolution" to be halted or undermined caused Hitler to announce that "The revolution is not a permanent condition." The unwillingness of Röhm and the SA to cease their agitation for a "Second Revolution", and the unwarranted fear of a "Röhm putsch" to accomplish it, were factors behind Hitler's purging of the SA leadership in the Night of the Long Knives in the summer of 1934.

Despite such tactical breaks necessitated by pragmatic concerns, which were typical for Hitler during his rise to power and in the early years of his regime, those who see Hitler as a revolutionary argue that he never ceased being a revolutionary dedicated to the radical transformation of Germany, especially when it concerned racial matters. In his monograph, Hitler: Study of a Revolutionary?, Martyn Housden concludes:

[Hitler] compiled a most extensive set of revolutionary goals (calling for radical social and political change); he mobilized a revolutionary following so extensive and powerful that many of his aims were achieved; he established and ran a dictatorial revolutionary state; and he disseminated his ideas abroad through a revolutionary foreign policy and war. In short, he defined and controlled the National Socialist revolution in all its phases.

There were aspects of Nazism which were undoubtedly reactionary, such as their attitude toward the role of women in society, which was completely traditionalist, calling for the return of women to the home as wives, mothers and homemakers, although ironically this ideological policy was undermined in reality by the growing labour shortages and need for more workers caused by men leaving the workforce for military service. The number of working women actually increased from 4.24 million in 1933 to 4.52 million in 1936 and 5.2 million in 1938, despite active discouragement and legal barriers put in place by the Nazi regime. Another reactionary aspect of Nazism was in their arts policy, which stemmed from Hitler's rejection of all forms of "degenerate" modern art, music and architecture.

Historian Martin Broszat describes Nazism as having:

...a peculiar hybrid, half-reactionary, half-revolutionary relationship to established society, to the political system and tradition. ...   [Its] ideology was almost like a backwards-looking Utopia. It derived from romantic pictures and clichés of the past, from warlike-heroic, patriarchal or absolutist ages, social and political systems, which, however, were translated into the popular and avant-garde, into the fighting slogans of totalitarian nationalism. The élitist notion of aristocratic nobility became the völkische 'nobility of blood' of the 'master race', the princely 'theory of divine right' gave way to the popular national Führer; the obedient submission to the active national 'following'.

Post-war Nazism 

Following Nazi Germany's defeat in World War II and the end of the Holocaust, overt expressions of support for Nazi ideas were prohibited in Germany and other European countries. Nonetheless, movements which self-identify as National Socialist or which are described as adhering to Nazism continue to exist on the fringes of politics in many western societies. Usually espousing a white supremacist ideology, many deliberately adopt the symbols of Nazi Germany.

See also 

 Comparison of Nazism and Stalinism
 Consequences of Nazism
 Falangism
 Fascism in the United States
 Functionalism versus intentionalism
 National Socialist Movement in the Netherlands
 Swedish National Socialist Party
 Swedish National Socialist Unity
 Swedish National Socialist Unity Party
 Italian Fascism
 Statism in Shōwa Japan
 List of books about Nazi Germany
 Nazi occultism
 Political views of Adolf Hitler
 Theodore Abel papers

References

Bibliography
 
 
 
 
 
 
 
 
 
 Goodrick-Clarke, Nicholas (2004) [1985]. The Occult Roots of Nazism: Secret Aryan Cults and Their Influence on Nazi Ideology: The Ariosophists of Austria and Germany, 1890–1935. Wellingborough, England: The Aquarian Press. .
 
 
 
 Klemperer, Victor (2006) [1957] The Language of the Third Reich: LTI – Lingua Tertii Imperii: A Philologist's Notebooks. New York: Continuum. 
 
 
 
 
 
 
 
 
 Redles, David (2005). Hitler's Millennial Reich: Apocalyptic Belief and the Search for Salvation. New York: University Press. .
 
 Steigmann-Gall, Richard (2003). The Holy Reich: Nazi Conceptions of Christianity, 1919–1945. Cambridge: Cambridge University Press.

External links 

 
 
 Hitler's National Socialist Party platform
 NS-Archiv, a large collection of scanned original Nazi documents.
 Exhibit on Hitler and the Germans – slideshow by The New York Times
 Jonathan Meades (1994):  (in 4 parts)
 One of the first anti-nazi films in history Calling mr. Smith (1943) against Hitler.

 
Antisemitism
Authoritarianism
Fascism
German words and phrases
The Holocaust
Homophobia
Politics of Nazi Germany
Right-wing ideologies
Totalitarianism
White supremacy
Xenophobia
Anti-communism